Kathryn Kuitenbrouwer (born February 6, 1965) is a Canadian novelist and short story writer.

Early life
Kuitenbrouwer was born in Ottawa, Ontario, and later moved to Toronto.

Career
Her debut short story collection, Way Up, was published in 2003. It was a shortlisted finalist for the Danuta Gleed Literary Award and the ReLit Award for short fiction in 2004. Her first novel, The Nettle Spinner, was published in 2005, and was a shortlisted nominee for the Amazon.ca First Novel Award. Her second novel, Perfecting, followed in 2009. Her most recent novel, All the Broken Things, was published in 2014 by Random House of Canada. It was a shortlisted finalist for the Toronto Book Award, long listed for Canada Reads in 2016, and was a national bestseller.

Kuitenbrouwer has also been a book reviewer for The Globe and Mail and the National Post, and has published short fiction in Granta, The Walrus, Numéro Cinq, Significant Objects, Maclean's Magazine, and Storyville.

In 2018, Kuitenbrouwer received a Ph.D. in English literature from the University of Toronto, where she was supervised by Mari Ruti. Her Ph.D. thesis is a psychoanalytic investigation into creativity, with special attention to the British novel in the eighteenth century.

References

External links

1965 births
21st-century Canadian short story writers
21st-century Canadian novelists
Canadian women short story writers
Canadian women novelists
Canadian literary critics
Canadian women literary critics
Living people
21st-century Canadian women writers
Writers from Ottawa
Canadian women non-fiction writers